Gabriel Ramos is an American politician and businessman who served as a member of the New Mexico Senate. Ramos represented the 28th district, which includes Socorro, Glenwood, and Silver City.

Education 
Ramos earned a Bachelor of Science degree in business and public administration from Western New Mexico University.

Career 
Prior to serving in the New Mexico Senate, Ramos served as Grant County Commissioner. He also worked as an insurance agent at State Farm and established a company, 1st Choice Satellite, Internet, And Home Security.

New Mexico Senate 
Ramos took office on January 15, 2019, appointed to fill the seat left vacant by Howie Morales, who was elected Lieutenant Governor of New Mexico.

Ramos has been criticized for voting with Republicans against his party on several issues. He voted to oppose a minimum-wage increase and voted against legislation to reduce gun violence. Ramos also backed the controversial billion-dollar Gila River diversion as a Grant County commissioner.

In the 2020 Democratic primary, Ramos was defeated for re-election by school psychologist Siah Correa Hemphill.

References 

Hispanic and Latino American state legislators in New Mexico
Democratic Party New Mexico state senators
County commissioners in New Mexico
Western New Mexico University alumni
People from Grant County, New Mexico
Year of birth missing (living people)
Living people
21st-century American politicians